Federico Dimarco (born 10 November 1997) is an Italian professional footballer who plays as a left-back or left midfielder for  club Inter Milan and the Italy national team.

Club career

Inter Milan 
A product of Inter Milan's youth academy, Dimarco made his debut for the club on 11 December 2014, aged 17, when he came on as a substitute for Danilo D'Ambrosio after 84 minutes in a goalless draw away to Qarabağ in the group stage of the UEFA Europa League, with his team having already advanced. He was called up for a Serie A match for the first time on 1 February 2015, remaining an unused substitute in a 1–3 defeat away to Sassuolo. Dimarco made his debut in Serie A on 31 May 2015, in the last match of the season in what would be a 4–3 win over Empoli, coming on in place of Rodrigo Palacio in the 89th minute of the game.

Loan to Ascoli 
In January 2016 he was sent on loan to Serie B club Ascoli with a 6-month loan deal. On 6 February, Dimarco made his debut for Ascoli in Serie B in a 0-0 home draw against Latina, he was replaced by Dario Del Fabro in the 81st minute. Dimarco finish his 6-month loan to Ascoli with 15 appearances and 4 assists.

Loan to Empoli 
He was sent on loan to Serie A club Empoli with a season-long loan deal. On 28 August 2016 he made his debut for Empoli in Serie A in a 2-0 away defeat against Udinese, he was replaced by Marco Zambelli in the 69th minute. On 29 November, Dimarco in the fourth round of the Coppa Italia in a match loss 2-1 in the extra time against Cesena. He finish his season-long loan to Empoli with 13 appearances, but Empoli was relegated in Serie B.

Sion 
On 30 June 2017, Dimarco was sold to Sion for a fee of €3.91 million. On 23 July 2017 he made his debut for Sion in the Swiss Super League in a 1-0 away win over Thun, he was replaced by Quentin Maceirais in the 41st minute for a fracture of the foot.

Return to Inter Milan 
On 5 July 2018, Inter exercised their buy-back clause to bring back Dimarco for €7 million.

On 7 August 2018, Dimarco  was loaned to Parma with an option to buy. He made his debut for Parma on 12 August in the third round of Coppa Italia, a 1–0 loss to Pisa. On 16 September, he scored his first goal in Serie A in a 1–0 win against Inter at San Siro.

On 31 January 2020, Dimarco moved to Hellas Verona on loan until the end of the season with an option for a permanent move. On 9 September 2020, his loan was extended for another season.

On 23 December 2021, Dimarco extended his Inter contract to June 2026.

International career
In 2013, he was a member of the Italy under-17 side which finished runners-up at the UEFA European Under-17 Championship in Slovakia and was eliminated in the second round of the FIFA U-17 World Cup. With the Italy under-19 he took part at the 2016 UEFA European Under-19 Championship, where Italy reached the final. He scored four goals in the tournament, including three penalties and one free kick.

In 2017, he took part in the FIFA U-20 World Cup in South Korea, in which the Italy under-20 finished third.

On 22 March 2018, he made his debut with the Italy under-21 in a friendly match against Norway, entering as a substitute for Giuseppe Pezzella (1–1). He scored his first goal for the under-21 on 11 September in a friendly against Albania (3–1).

He was called up to the senior Italy squad for the 2021 UEFA Nations League Finals.

Style of play
Considered to be a promising young prospect, Dimarco is a left-footed defender who usually plays as a left-back, although he is also capable of playing on the right. He is known in particular for his pace, tireless running, eye for goal, and his powerful and accurate shot from set pieces, as well as his ability to interpret the game, which enables him to aid his team both defensively and offensively. In spite of his small stature and slender physique, he possesses significant strength and good technical skills.

Personal life
Dimarco has a younger brother, Christian, who is a professional footballer as well.

Career statistics

Club

International

Italy score listed first, score column indicates score after each Dimarco goal.

Honours
Inter Milan
 Coppa Italia: 2021–22
 Supercoppa Italiana: 2021, 2022

Italy U17 
UEFA European Under-17 Championship runner-up: 2013

Italy U19
UEFA European Under-19 Championship runner-up: 2016

Italy U20
FIFA U-20 World Cup bronze medal: 2017

Italy
UEFA Nations League third place: 2020–21

References

External links 
 Profile at the Inter Milan website
 

1997 births
Living people
Italian footballers
Italy youth international footballers
Italian expatriate footballers
Italian expatriate sportspeople in Switzerland
Expatriate footballers in Switzerland
Serie A players
Serie B players
Swiss Super League players
Inter Milan players
Ascoli Calcio 1898 F.C. players
Empoli F.C. players
FC Sion players
Parma Calcio 1913 players
Hellas Verona F.C. players
Footballers from Milan
Association football defenders